Oedipus Schmoedipus is an album by the English musician Barry Adamson, released in 1996. Like Adamson's previous albums, Oedipus Schmoedipus was conceived as a soundtrack to an imaginary film. The album peaked at No. 51 on the UK Albums Chart.

"Something Wicked This Way Comes" appears in the David Lynch film Lost Highway.

Production
The album was produced by Adamson. Nick Cave cowrote and contributed vocals to "The Sweetest Embrace", while Jarvis Cocker cowrote and sang on "Set the Controls for the Heart of the Pelvis". Billy Mackenzie sang on "Achieved in the Valley of Dolls".

Critical reception

NME called the album "too cool to be cringingly kitsch, too deep to be flaky." Pitchfork stated that "with 13 tracks that sound like they could take form and commit acts of homicide on their own, the former Bad Seed's creation is undeniably ... alive."

The Guardian determined that "Adamson's psychogeographical soundtracks snag your head and won't let go: he's made a (bad) dream of a music that simulates mainstream accessibility but is drenched with the maker's own terrors, memories, fixations." Rolling Stone thought that "Adamson can brilliantly—and without words—suggest entire movie scenes with dizzying combinations of dance beats, jazz phrases, finger-snapping big-band arrangements, luscious strings and even references to '60s French pop."

AllMusic wrote that "Adamson's skill in layering and devising unusual sound textures still qualifies him as one of experimental rock's more imaginative composers and producers." Dave Thompson referred to the album as a "supreme slab of disturbance-with-a-(bit of a)-beat."

Track listing
All tracks composed by Barry Adamson; except where noted.

Sample of "Vertigo" taken from The Vertigo Suite
Sample of "O' Les Temps des Souvenirs" by Françoise Hardy 
Sample of "Blue Lines" by Massive Attack

Personnel
Barry Adamson - lead vocals
Mark De Lane Lea, Ken Low - guitar
Richard Hand - classical guitar
Jarvis Cocker - vocals on "Set the Controls for the Heart of the Pelvis"
Billy Mackenzie - vocals on "Achieved in the Valley of Dolls"
Nick Cave - vocals on "The Sweetest Embrace"
Seamus Beaghen - Hammond organ, piano
Pete Wyman - saxophone, clarinet
Ileana Ruhemann - alto flute
Carla Bozulich, John Napier - voice overs on "It's Business As Usual"
Miranda Gooch - storyteller on "Vermillion Kisses"
Beverley Skeete, Chantel Mapp, Roy Hamilton, Zeeteah Massiah - backing vocals
Atticus Ross - programming and sounds on tracks 1-6
Ivor Wimborne - additional programming
Audrey Riley, Billy McGee - string arrangements
Technical
Kevin Petrie - recording
Barry Adamson, Simon Henwood - sleeve concept
Steve Gullick - cover photography, still from Philippe Garrel's Le Révélateur

References

Barry Adamson albums
1996 albums
Mute Records albums